Kelly Ana Morey (born 1968) is a novelist and poet from New Zealand.

Background 
Born in 1969, Morey is of Ngāti Kurī, Te Rarawa, Te Aupōuri, and Pākehā descent and grew up in Papua New Guinea. She received a BA in English, MA in contemporary Māori art, an MALit, and is pursuing a PhD. She currently lives in Kaipara.

Publications

Fiction 
Novels by Morey include:
 Bloom (2003, Penguin)
 Grace is Gone (2005, Penguin)
 On an Island, with Consequences Dire (2007, Penguin)
 Quinine (2010, Huia)
 Daylight Second (2016, HarperCollins)
Short stories and poems by Morey have been included in 100 Short, Short Stories, anthologies of Māori writing by Huia Publishers, Whetu Moana: Contemporary Polynesian Poetry in English, and Puna Wai Korer: An Anthology of Maori Poetry in English.

Non-fiction 
Morey has served as an oral historian at the Royal New Zealand Navy Museum since 2002. She is the author of Service to the Sea, a non-fiction work about the Royal New Zealand Navy's history.

Morey published How to Read a Book in 2005, a reflection on books that have influenced her life and writing. In 2013, she documented the history of St Cuthbert's College in St Cuthbert’s College 100 Years, She is also contributor to The Spinoff and the equestrian magazine Show Circuit.

Awards 

Bloom won the 2004 NZSA Hubert Church Best First Book Award for Fiction at the Montana New Zealand Book Awards. Grace is Gone was a finalist for the Kiriyama Prize for fiction She was the winner of the 2005 Janet Frame Award for Fiction.

In 2003, Morey received the Todd Young Writers’ Bursary. In 2014 she received the Māori Writer's Residency at the Michael King Writers’ Centre during which time she developed her novel Daylight Second.

References 

Living people
1968 births
Te Aupōuri people
People from the Kaipara District
New Zealand fiction writers
New Zealand women novelists